Salthouse is an English surname. Notable people with the surname include:

Chris Salthouse, New Zealand sailor
John Salthouse (born 1951), British actor and producer
Robert Salthouse (born 1965), New Zealand sailor
Timothy A. Salthouse, American psychologist

English-language surnames